March 1963 is an album by  folk and blues musician John Koerner, released in 2010.

History
Following a ten-hour studio session with friends Dave Ray and Tony Glover on March 24, 1963, for the album Blues, Rags and Hollers, Koerner did a set at a local folk club and then an interview and performance for a Milwaukee radio station. Producer Mark Trehus acquired the tape of the radio performance several decades later. "Just the idea that there was unreleased recordings, by the guy I consider to be possibly the greatest living practitioner of American folk music in America today, was just exciting beyond belief for me," Trehus said.

Reception

Allmusic music critic Steve Leggett wrote of the album "Koerner played a dozen or so songs that night in his half-traditional, half-revisionist style accompanied by his charging 12-string guitar, harmonica interludes, and plenty of foot stomping. “Duncan & Brady” is an onrushing delight and there’s an early version of “Southbound Train” here, too, along with several other gems."

Track listing
All songs by John Koerner unless otherwise noted.
 "Interview" – 0:39	
 "Duncan and Brady" (traditional) – 3:31	
 "Southbound Train" – 2:36	
 "Hangman" (Lead Belly) – 3:02	
 "Rock Me" – 3:14	
 "Too Bad Blues" – 2:17	
 "Guitar Fools" – 2:09	
 "Creepy John" – 2:57	
 "You've Got to Be Careful" – 2:35	
 "Interview" – 0:29	
 "Good Time Charlie" – 1:48	
 "Ramblin' Blues" – 3:07	
 "Ramblin' Blues" + untitled instrumental (edited) – 13:07

Personnel
"Spider" John Koerner – guitar, harmonica, vocals
Mark Trehus – producer
Tony Glover – liner notes
Stefan Kren – editing
Ed Nunn – cover photo
Brad Wolstad – design

References

John Koerner albums
2010 live albums